Happy Hearts may refer to:
 Happy Hearts (2007 film), a Philippine romantic-comedy film
 Happy Hearts (1932 film), a French comedy film

See also
 Happy Heart, a song by Petula Clark, and by Andy Williams 
 Happy Heart (album), an album by Andy Williams